Olshana known from 1962 - 2007 as Vilshana is a village in Ukraine, in Pryluky Raion of Chernihiv Oblast. It belongs to Ichnia urban hromada, one of the hromadas of Ukraine. The population is 511 people. The Olshana's village council is governed by 2 farms: Tarasivka and Zhovtneve (since 2016, the village of Nova Olshana).

Until 18 July 2020, Olshana belonged to Ichnia Raion. The raion was abolished in July 2020 as part of the administrative reform of Ukraine, which reduced the number of raions of Chernihiv Oblast to five. The area of Ichnia Raion was merged into Pryluky Raion.

Further reading 
 Записки Императорского русского географического общества. Том 11. 1856 г., с. 368: «Поселение: Ольшана. В нём: м.п. 1176, ж. 1280, всего 2456».
 Географическо-статистический словарь Российской Империи. Том 3. 1867 г., с. 638: «Ольшана: село, Полтавской г-нии, Прилукскаго у-да, на транспортной дороге из г. Прилук в г. Ромны, в 15 вер. от у-дного г-да, при безымянном пруде. Ч. жителей, малороссов, 2,429 об. п.; 468 дв. Церковь правосл. 1, сельск. ущилище, заводы сахарный и винокуренный».
 Россия. В. П. Семёнов-Тян-Шанский. 1903 г., с. 361: «Верстах в 5 на восток от станции [Левки] расположено волостное село Прилуцкаго у. Ольшана, имеющее около 3½ тыс. жителей, церковь, несколько лавок, до 50 ветр. мельниц и несколько маслобойных заводиков».
 Энциклопедический словарь Ф. А. Брокгауза и И. А. Ефрона. Петербург, 1890—1907 гг.: «Ольшана, село Полтавской губернии, Прилукского уезда, в 5 верстах от железнодорожной станции Левки. 3500 жителей; лавки, маслобойные заводы кустарного характера».

References

External links
 

Priluksky Uyezd
Villages in Pryluky Raion